Jarocin Festival was one of the biggest and most important rock music festivals in 1980s Europe, by far the biggest festival of alternative music in the Warsaw Pact countries.

Founded in 1980, the festival was based on the earlier Wielkopolskie Rytmy Młodych (Greater Poland’s Rhythms of the Youth), which had been organised in Jarocin since 1971. In 1980, due to Walter Chelstowski’s initiative, its name was changed to Ogólnopolski Przegląd Muzyki Młodej Generacji w Jarocinie (All-Polish Review of Music of Young Generation in Jarocin) and subsequently, musicians and bands from the whole country were invited. Later on, its name was changed again - to Festiwal Muzyków Rockowych (Rock Musicians’ Festival).

Jarocin’s festival was based in terms of its organisation and atmosphere on the famous American Woodstock Festival, thus it is sometimes called the Polish Woodstock. In the 1980s it was regarded as an escape from the drab, poor reality of the late period Polish People's Republic. It lasted 3 days, and was usually held at the beginning of August. The Festival attracted thousands of fans (e.g. in 1986 there were more than 30,000 of them), who lived in tents and came to listen to music which was otherwise hardly (or never) played on Polish radio or TV. Still, many believe that Jarocin was designed by the totalitarian government's secret services, to create a "safe outlet" for the restless Polish youth.

A variety of music was played over the course of the festival, but generally speaking, "alternative" genres - blues, rock, heavy metal, punk rock, and reggae were played. Bands performed on two stages, with the bigger one located on the local football pitch. Many fans brought cassette players with them to record the music. This was one of the only chances to record and distribute music on cassettes that didn't appear in official mass-media.

Jarocin Festival lost its popularity in the early 1990s, after the collapse of the Eastern Bloc and the resulting easier access to alternative music. The new generation of festival-goers was also more aggressive, and in 1994, after riots and clashes with police, the festival was suspended. It resumed again in 2005.

Among the most popular bands that played or debuted in Jarocin, there are:
 Dżem
 TSA
 KSU
 Armia
 Dezerter
 Siekiera
 Kult
 Brygada Kryzys
 Kat
 Sztywny Pal Azji
 Acid Drinkers
 Koniec Świata
 New Model Army
 Therapy
 The Misfits
 Babayaga Ojo
 Feeling B

The festival played an important part in the early days of the Polish punk scene, with Nocne Szczury, one of the earliest punk bands in Poland, being the first punk rock band to perform there in 1980.

References

 Internet forum about history of the festivals 
 Several articles on history of the Festival

External links

  
 Photos from 1986-1988 Festivals in Jarocin
 Footage of the streets of Jarocin during the 1985 Festival, with music by Moskwa

Music festivals in Poland
Rock festivals in Poland